Streptomyces fuscichromogenes is a bacterium species from the genus of Streptomyces which has been isolated from soil from Xishuangbanna in China.

See also 
 List of Streptomyces species

References

External links
Type strain of Streptomyces fuscichromogenes at BacDive -  the Bacterial Diversity Metadatabase

 

fuscichromogenes
Bacteria described in 2017